Tokitsukaze (時津風, Favorable Wind) was one of four s built for the Imperial Japanese Navy during World War I.

Design and description
The Isokaze-class destroyers were enlarged and improved versions of the preceding . Tokitsukaze was powered by three Brown-Curtis geared steam turbines, each driving one shaft using steam produced by five Kampon water-tube boilers. Two boilers burned a mixture of coal and fuel oil while the other three only used oil. Their crew consisted of 92 officers and ratings.

The main armament of the Isokaze-class ships consisted of four quick-firing (QF)  gun on single mounts. One gun was located on the bow, another between the forward pair of funnels, and the last two fore and aft of the rear superstructure. The destroyers' torpedo armament consisted of three twin rotating mounts for  torpedoes. One mount was positioned between the forward funnel and the forecastle while the other pair were between the aft guns and the rear funnel.

Construction and career 
Tokitsukaze was built at Kawasaki's shipyard in Kobe. The ship was launched on 27 December 1916 and completed on 31 May 1917. She ran aground in heavy rain near Aoshima Island in Miyazaki Prefecture, Kyūshū on 25 March 1918. The ship broke in half, but her equipment and weapons were salvaged. A replacement hull was begun at Maizuru Naval Arsenal on 2 December. Decommissioned on 1 April 1935, she was hulked and renamed Haikan No. 20 as a training ship at the Imperial Japanese Navy Academy at Etajima in 1940. The ship survived World War II, but was sunk in a typhoon shortly after the war ended.

References

Bibliography

 

Isokaze-class destroyers
1917 ships
Ships built by Kawasaki Heavy Industries